Saltaire is a model village in Shipley, a ward in the metropolitan borough of the City of Bradford, West Yorkshire, England. The village contains 93 listed buildings that are recorded in the National Heritage List for England. Of these, one is listed at Grade I, the highest of the three grades, four are at Grade II*, the middle grade, and the others are at Grade II, the lowest grade. In 1850 Titus Salt started to build a textile mill, known as Salt's Mill, alongside the Leeds and Liverpool Canal and then developed the model village to house and serve its workers. This included housing, shops, and community buildings, all of which are listed. The architects for the entire scheme, including later mills, were the Bradford architects Lockwood and Mawson. All the listed buildings built between 1850 and 1870 were designed by them.  The later listed buildings are a tram shed, a war memorial and a telephone kiosk.


Key

Buildings

References

Citations

Sources

Lists of listed buildings in West Yorkshire